Billy Butler (born William E. Butler; June 7, 1945 – March 31, 2015) was an American soul singer and songwriter active in the 1960s and 1970s. He was born in Chicago, Illinois. His elder brother, Jerry, was also a singer and songwriter for whose band Billy played the guitar.

Career
Billy Butler formed the vocal group the Enchanters while at high school. He first recorded for Okeh Records in 1963, and was produced initially by Curtis Mayfield and later by Carl Davis. 

On early recordings he was backed by the Chanters, a renamed version of the Enchanters; other members were Errol Batts and Jesse Tillman. His first and biggest hit was 1965's "I Can't Work No Longer", which reached #6 on the U.S. Billboard R&B Singles chart and #60 on the Billboard Hot 100. The group disbanded in 1966, and after a minor solo hit with "The Right Track" he left Okeh. "The Right Track" is placed at number 11 in the Northern Soul Top 500

He later formed a new group, Infinity, with Batts, Larry Wade and Phyllis Knox. They had three minor R&B hits: "Get on the Case" (#41 R&B, Fountain Records, 1969), "I Don't Want to Lose You" (Memphis Records, #37 R&B, 1971), and "Hung Up on You" (Pride Records, #48 R&B, 1973). He also wrote songs for his brother, as well as for such musicians as Major Lance and Gene Chandler.

Billy Butler died in 2015, aged 69, in his native Chicago.

Discography

Studio albums
 Right Track (1966)
 Hung Up on You (1973, with Infinity)
 Sugar Candy Lady (1977)

Singles

References

External links
 

1945 births
2015 deaths
American soul singers
American male singers
Okeh Records artists
Singers from Chicago
Northern soul musicians
Black & Blue Records artists